Walt Steenkamp (born 21 July 1995) is a South African rugby union player for the Blue Bulls in the new upcoming Rainbow Cup and in the Currie Cup. His regular position is lock.

Career

In 2016 Steenkamp made his mark in the FNB Varsity Cup for the NWU-Pukke. He was instrumental in clinching the 2016 Varsity Cup against the FNB Maties in overtime. In 2018, he was awarded the Player that Rocks award. After his varsity career he moved on to the Currie Cup First Division, where he made a massive impact for the Leopards.

In 2018, Steenkamp made the move to the Free State Cheetahs, where he continued to impress in the Pro14.

Honours
 Pro14 Rainbow Cup runner-up 2021
 United Rugby Championship runner-up 2021-22

References

South African rugby union players
Living people
1995 births
People from Rustenburg
Rugby union locks
Cheetahs (rugby union) players
Leopards (rugby union) players
Free State Cheetahs players
Bulls (rugby union) players
Blue Bulls players
Rugby union players from North West (South African province)
Mitsubishi Sagamihara DynaBoars players